The Ecole Supérieure Roi Fahd de Traduction (ESRFT, "King Fahd School of Translation") is a translation and interpreting school located in Tangier, Morocco.

History and operations
The school was established in Tangier in 1986 in an attempt to regularize the training of translators in this multilingual region. Before then, specialized centres for training translators did not exist in the Arab world.

See also
 List of things named after Saudi Kings

References

External links 
 , the school's official website

1986 establishments in Morocco
Educational institutions established in 1986
Schools in Tangier
Translation and interpreting schools
Universities and colleges in Morocco
20th-century architecture in Morocco